F2 Logistics Philippines, Inc. is a logistics company based in the Philippines. It was established by Efren Uy in 2006.

Services
Among the services provided by F2 Logistics include warehousing, cold chain distribution, ISO tank solutions, customs brokerage, and oversized cargo movement. The company also provide international freight forwarding through its network of partner sea and airfreight firms. F2 Logistics deals with the transport of retail goods such as food items to supermarkets, fast food outlets, and other retail outlets as well as medicine to drugstores.

Involvement in elections
F2 Logistics has been involved in the distribution of election equipment and paraphernalia in the Philippines. It was the national courier of the Commission on Elections (COMELEC) for the 2018 barangay and Sangguniang Kabataan elections. F2 Logistics has also secured two of four delivery contracts for the 2019 elections.

The company has also secured a distribution deal with the COMELEC for the 2022 national elections. The deal has been questioned by Senator Leila de Lima, the National Citizens' Movement for Free Elections, and other civic groups, due to F2 Logistics chairman Dennis Uy's association with incumbent President Rodrigo Duterte, believing that the company has a conflict of interest. Among the company's incorporators include the Duterte administration's executive secretary Salvador Medialdea. The COMELEC dispute the allegation, saying that the awarding of the associated contract was done through public bidding and that F2 Logistics was awarded the deal on the merit that the company offered the lowest responsive bid.

Sports
F2 Logistics is also involved in sports. It owns the F2 Logistics Cargo Movers, a women's volleyball team which competed in the Philippine Super Liga. It also sponsors the La Salle women's volleyball team and the Parañaque Patriots basketball team of the Maharlika Pilipinas Basketball League.

References

2006 establishments in the Philippines
Logistics companies of the Philippines
Companies based in Parañaque
Philippine companies established in 2006